Vysoky is a rural locality (a khutor) in Starooskolsky District, Belgorod Oblast, Russia. The population was 91 as of 2010. There is 1 street.

Geography 
Vysoky is located 56 km southeast of Stary Oskol (the district's administrative centre) by road. Vladimirovka and Borovaya are the nearest rural localities.

References 

Rural localities in Starooskolsky District